Andrei Anatolyevich Sitchikhin (born 15 August 1974) is a Russian professional football coach and a former player.

Club career
As a player, he made his debut in the Soviet Second League B in 1991 for FC Neftekhimik Nizhnekamsk . He played 10 seasons in the Russian Football National League for Neftekhimik.

References

1974 births
People from Nizhnekamsk
Living people
Russian footballers
Association football midfielders
FC Tobol players
FC Neftekhimik Nizhnekamsk players
Kazakhstan Premier League players
Russian expatriate footballers
Expatriate footballers in Kazakhstan
Russian football managers
Sportspeople from Tatarstan